Gertie Eggink (born 21 February 1980) is a Dutch sidecarcross rider and the 2010 Sidecarcross World Champion, riding as passenger with Daniël Willemsen.

Like the Willemsen brothers Daniël and Marcel Eggink hails from Lochem, Gelderland.

Biography
Gertie Eggink started racing in the world championship from 2004 onwards with a variety of riders.

Eggink raced the 2010 season with multiple world champion Daniël Willemsen after the later had an unsuccessful 2009 season, only coming fifth, suffering a broken collar bone that made him miss some races. Eggink raced with Willemsen in 12 of the 14 Grand Prix of the season, winning 14 races and three Grand Prix. In the last two races of the season however Willemsen had to replace Eggink with Dagwin Sabbe as Eggink was advised by his doctor not to race in the final GP's. In a tight season the pair eventually won the world championship by nine points, ahead of defending champions Joris Hendrickx and Kaspars Liepiņš. Eggink, after the race in Poland, lost consciousness and, completely exhausted, had to be taken to hospital. Eggink suffered health problems throughout the seasons which were eventually diagnosed as virus in his blood.

In 2011 and 2012 he was racing with Marcel Willemsen, the younger brother of Daniël Willemsen, achieving good results and sitting in the top ten of the competition in 2012 after coming 21st in 2011, in a difficult season that saw the Marcel brake three rips and bruise his neck, and saw them suffering financial setbacks through engine trouble.

In the 2013 season he only took part in one event of the GP season, the first race of the Belgian GP, where he, as the passenger of Marcel Willemsen. The pair entered five Grand Prix in 2014 and came 20th overall.

Season by season
The season-by-season results for Gertie Eggink in the world championship:

Honours

World Championship
 Champions: 2010

References

External links
 The World Championship on Sidecarcross.com

1980 births
Living people
Dutch sidecarcross riders
People from Lochem
Sportspeople from Gelderland